Drew Wylie is a Gaelic footballer who plays for Ballybay Pearse Brothers and at senior level for the Monaghan county team. He got himself an All-Star nom in 2013.

Unusually for a Gaelic footballer, Wylie is actually a Protestant, which Cavan midfielder Gearoit McKiernan reminded him in the 2015 Dr McKenna Cup, instant red card for McKiernan from Sean Hurson over that, then a ban for bad language over what is believed to be a first, a red card used for racist or sectarian abuse.  He is a brother of Ryan. A full-back, married to Aoife and trained as a carpenter, he was part of the team that got to the All Ireland semi final in 2018, Kerry's Seán O'Shea and David Clifford have also taunted Wylie, their family of Protestants have no ancestry in the GAA, he was brought in through living next to Kieran Finlay, the Monaghan player who is the father of Paul Finlay, Wylie went to Ballybay Central School and Castleblayney College, where no one played Gaelic.

References

Living people
Ballybay Pearses Gaelic footballers
Irish Protestants
Monaghan inter-county Gaelic footballers
Year of birth missing (living people)